I Gusti Ngurah Bayu Sutha (born 28 May 1977 in Gianyar, Bali) is an Indonesian footballer, he normally plays as a defender for the Indonesia national football team, normally people call him Bayu or Bayu Sutha. In the Asian Cup 2007 he was just used as a reserve player if another player from the starting squad was injured, especially if they were a defensive player. His parents' names are I Gusti Ngurah Bagus (father) and Ni Gusti Ayu Rai Puspawati (mother). He is currently the only Balinese to represent Indonesia in national side. His idol is Paolo Maldini and his favourite music is pop.
Bayu Sutha was born into an artist family and he has artistic talent like his brothers. His parents wanted him to be an artist, but he often escaped and choose playing football(soccer).

References

1977 births
Living people
Balinese people
Indonesian Hindus
Indonesian footballers
Persib Bandung players
People from Gianyar Regency
Sportspeople from Bali
Association football defenders
Indonesia international footballers